Aleksandar Kapisoda (born 17 September 1989 in Osijek) is a Croatia-born Montenegrin professional football player 

When he was younger he is two time's karate champion in Serbia and Montenegro. Two time's champion with FK Mogren in Montenegro and one-time winner in Montenegro cup.

Club career

Thailand
Securing a move to Air Force Central, then of the Thai League 2, in January 2016, Kapisoda was received well by the club, becoming their first foreign captain and even developing a camaraderie with the fans. Despite a poor start to the 2016 season, the Montenegrin defender helped Air Force Central reach fourth place, staying there for another year and gaining the attention of several other Thai teams.

References

External links 
 

1989 births
Living people
Footballers from Osijek
Association football central defenders
Croatian footballers
Montenegrin footballers
FK Mogren players
OFK Petrovac players
Aleksandar Kapisoda
Aleksandar Kapisoda
Aleksandar Kapisoda
Montenegrin First League players
Aleksandar Kapisoda
Aleksandar Kapisoda
Croatian expatriate footballers
Montenegrin expatriate footballers
Expatriate footballers in Thailand
Montenegrin expatriate sportspeople in Thailand
Croatian expatriate sportspeople in Thailand
Nakhon Si United F.C. players